European Universities Bridge Championships were the first organised in 2009 and have been organised on a bi-annual basis since.

The European Universities Bridge Championships are coordinated by the European University Sports Association along with the 18 other sports on the program of the European universities championships.

Overview

External links

References

 

bridge
Contract bridge zonal competitions